Melacacidin is a  chemical compound related to leucoanthocyanidins. It can be found in Acacia crassicarpa.

Melacacidin is a compound that can provoke contact allergy to Australian blackwood Acacia melanoxylon.

References

Leucoanthocyanidins
Catechols
Enediols